Adolf Rzepko (1825 – 1892) was a Polish composer, oboist, choral and orchestral conductor, and pianist.

He was a disciple of Václav Tomášek. He was mainly active as a performer (he served for many years as the Wielki Theatre orchestra's principal oboe), a choral conductor and a pedagogue. He was the author of two music treatises: The principles of music (1869) and A piano school.

Rzepko was born in Prague. He died in Warsaw.

References
 Grove Dictionary of Music and Musicians, 1980 - vol. XVI, page 360.

External side 
 Adolf Rzepko's music sheets in digital library Polona.pl

Classical oboists
Polish conductors (music)
Male conductors (music)
Polish composers
Polish classical pianists
Male classical pianists
1825 births
1892 deaths
19th-century composers
19th-century conductors (music)
19th-century classical pianists